The Brooklyn Morse Dry Dock were an early 20th-century American soccer team sponsored by the Morse Dry Dock and Repair Company (Morse D.D.&R.). The team played its home games at Morse Oval in South Brooklyn.

Morse played the 1917–1918 season in the Metropolitan Division of the New York State League.

In 1918, Morse signed seven players from the Fall River Rovers. Using this infusion of talent, the team went to the quarterfinals of the American Cup and the semifinals of the National Challenge Cup. That year is won the Southern New York State Association Cup, In the fall of 1919, the team entered the professional National Association Football League, finishing sixth in a ten team division, before withdrawing from the pro ranks and reverting to amateur status.

References

Defunct soccer clubs in New York City
National Association Football League teams
Men's soccer clubs in New York (state)
Sports in Brooklyn
Works soccer clubs in the United States